White Trash Superstar is the first studio album released by Alabama rock group Lynam.  White Trash Superstar was re-released on iTunes in 2008.  The song "The Party Starts Now" appeared on the soundtrack to the 2004 movie Catch That Kid.

Track listing
 "A"
 "The Best Thing"
 "Sex Pool"
 "The Party Starts Now"
 "Pet Vulcan"
 "Needle Park"
 "You'll Never Know"
 "Orenda"
 "Leave Me Alone"
 "Z"

2002 debut albums
Lynam (band) albums